Murder Mile is a nickname sometimes given to roads known for high crime rates or military conflict.

Cyprus 
Now a popular shopping destination, Ledra Street in Nicosia was called "Murder Mile" in the late 1950s when it was still under British rule, as the EOKA targeted British soldiers in their fight for Cypriot independence.

United Kingdom

England 
In London, in the borough of Hackney, a mile-long road stretching from Upper Clapton to Lower Clapton was referred to as Britain's Murder Mile due to the high number of murders committed in the area. It also featured in the 2004 film Bullet Boy.

Northern Ireland 
The streets of south Armagh and Belfast in Northern Ireland were notoriously violent during The Troubles.

Yemen 
Main Road in Mualla, a district of Aden, became known as the Murder Mile during the British occupation in the 1960s.

References

External links
 

Crime in the United Kingdom